Redenção da Serra (Portuguese for Redemption of the mountains) is a municipality (município) in the eastern part of the state of São Paulo in Brazil. It is part of the Metropolitan Region of Vale do Paraíba e Litoral Norte. The population is 3,839 (2020 est.) in an area of 309.44 km2. The elevation is 730 m.

The municipality contains part of the  Mananciais do Rio Paraíba do Sul Environmental Protection Area, created in 1982 to protect the sources of the Paraíba do Sul river.

History
The modern history of Redenção da Serra goes back to the start of the nineteenth century.   As the gold mines of Minas Gerais became depleted the focus of the Brazilian economy shifted towards the Paraíba Valley and the production of coffee.   The growth of the coffee monoculture drove rapid economic growth, leading to expansion and prosperity for a number of urban centers such as Taubaté, Pindamonhangaba, Guaratinguetá, Lorena and Bananal.

References

Municipalities in São Paulo (state)